The Stupčanica is a small river in central-northern part of Bosnia and Herzegovina. The Stupčanica meets with the Bioštica at the small town of Olovo, and with the Bioštica it makes a pair of the Krivaja source headwaters and its right tributary. The Stupčanica river canyon, Čude Canyon, is a protected natural monument of Bosnia and Herzegovina.

References

Rivers of Bosnia and Herzegovina
Krivaja (Bosna)